Mahendra Sandhu  (born 18 April 1947) is an Indian actor, who worked in Hindi film and Punjabi films, most known for Agent Vinod (1977), produced by Rajshri Pictures.

Early life and education
Sandhu was born into a Sandhu Jat Sikh family in the city of Patiala, Punjab. He graduated from Mohindra College, Patiala. He was very active in doing plays and was associated with Harpal Tiwana & Balwant Gargi. In 1970, he joined the Film and Television Institute of India Pune, and did two years acting course.

Career
Mahendra Sandhu started his career in 1973 with Khoon Khoon, a movie inspired by Dirty Harry. He has acted in 30 films, most famously in Agent Vinod (1977), produced by Rajshri Pictures. He had impressed Tarachand Barjatya with his performance in Khoon Ki Keemat and was offered two movies. He refused those, but agreed to work in Agent Vinod.

Directorial career
Mahendra Sandhu directed the movie Kisme Kitna Hai Dum in 1992.

Later career
Mahendra Sandhu made an appearance in the 2004 film Mitter Pyare Nu Haal Mureedan Da Kehna, but was credited as "Mohinder Sandhu". He later purchased land in Boisar, about 90 minutes from Mumbai airport and is currently building weekend homes.

He was approached for a cameo role in Agent Vinod in 2011, but it did not work out. However, there is a dialogue in the film that is a tribute to him. When Saif Ali Khan's character is being interrogated at a base in Pakistan/Afghanistan, he reveals the identity of Ravikishan's character as an Indian spy named Major Mahendra Sandhu.

After his film career, Sandhu started a real estate business, and divided time between Mumbai and Punjab.

Filmography

Actor

Producer

See also
 List of Indian film actors

References

External links
 

Male actors from Punjab, India
Living people
Male actors in Hindi cinema
Hindi film producers
People from Patiala
1947 births
Punjabi people
Male actors in Punjabi cinema
20th-century Indian male actors
21st-century Indian male actors